El Perelló is a municipality in the comarca of the Baix Ebre in Catalonia, Spain. It is situated in the north of the comarca, below the Boix and Cabrafeixet ranges. The N-340 road runs around the town, and connects it with the A-7 autopista at l'Ampolla.

Demography 
The municipality of l'Ampolla formed part of El Perelló until 1990; their combined population as of 2007 is 2895. Population figures below are for the territory of El Perelló as of the date given.

References

 Panareda Clopés, Josep Maria; Rios Calvet, Jaume; Rabella Vives, Josep Maria (1989). Guia de Catalunya, Barcelona: Caixa de Catalunya.  (Spanish).  (Catalan).

External links

Official website 
 Government data pages 

Municipalities in Baix Ebre
Populated places in Baix Ebre